Route 114 is a Connecticut state highway in the western suburbs of New Haven, running from Orange to Woodbridge. Other than at its junction with Route 63, it is signed north and south.

Route description
Route 114 begins as Racebrook Road at an intersection with US 1 in Orange and heads north. It intersects with Route 34 in northern Orange  from the south end and continues northward into the town of Woodbridge. In Woodbridge, it passes over the Wilbur Cross Parkway without a junction, then intersects with Route 243  later and with Route 313 another  after that. As Route 114 approaches Woodbridge center, it shifts to Center Road making a sharp right turn then crossing the Wepawaug River. Route 114 continues east for another  before ending at an intersection with Route 63.

History
Route 114 was established as part of the 1932 state highway renumbering. It  originally ran in a "C" pattern within the town of Woodbridge, connecting at both ends with Route 63 (then Route 67) and serving Woodbridge center. The original route used modern Route 114 from its north end until the intersection with Route 243. Then it proceeded east along Route 243 (Ansonia Road/Fountain Street) until it met Route 63 again in the Westville neighborhood of New Haven. In 1951, the southern segment of Route 114 was relocated and extended south to its current terminus at Route 1 using former SR 442. The old alignment became an unsigned state-maintained road (part of reconfigured SR 552).

Junction list

References

External links

114
Transportation in New Haven County, Connecticut
Orange, Connecticut
Woodbridge, Connecticut